

National

Provincial

Central Division

Eastern Division

Northern Division

Western Division

By party

FijiFirst
FijiFirst, led by Frank Bainimarama was re-elected Prime Minister. FijiFirst won just over 50% of the vote, narrowly winning a one-seat majority of seats in Parliament. Bainimarama lost five seats and suffered swings against him in every division except the Eastern Division. Despite this, FijiFirst was the largest party every division except the Eastern and Central Divisions (FijiFirst was the largest party in the last election in the latter division). Like the last election, some accused Bainimarama of electoral fraud, despite others stating that it was a free and fair election. Bainimarama later blamed rain and other poor weather for a loss of votes, which especially hit FijiFirst's strongest region, the Western Division, including the stronghold city of Nadi.

SODELPA
The Social Democratic Liberal Party (SODELPA), led by former Prime Minister Sitiveni Rabuka (who later became Prime Minister again in 2022), won 21 seats. Every division except the Eastern Division swung to SODELPA. SODELPA retained its place as the largest party in the Eastern Division and replaced FijiFirst as the largest party in the Central Division. SODELPA's voters are typically Indigenous Fijians (iTaukei).

Other parties
The two minor parties with predominantly Indo-Fijian supporters, the National Federation Party (NFP) and the Fiji Labour Party (FLP) also contested. The NFP had increased swings in every division, retaining its three seats. The FLP, however, won no seats and was placed last nationally and in every division except the Western Division. Two new parties, the Unity Fiji Party (UFP) and the HOPE party, also contested, but won no seats. However, the UFP placed higher than the FLP nationally and in every division, as did the HOPE party both nationally and in every division except the Western Division.

References

2018